Kottawa Railway Station is a railway station near Kottawa, Sri Lanka, which is a suburb city of Colombo. This station serves the Kaleni Valley Line and services are provided by Sri Lanka Railways.

History 
Kottawa railway station was rebuilt in a new location during the Broad-gauge project of the Kelani Valley line.

Location 
Kottawa Station is 500m north of Kottawa along the Athurugiriya road.

Services 
The station is served by the Kelani Valley Line, which connects Colombo to Avissawella.

See also 
Railway stations in Sri Lanka
Sri Lanka Railways
List of railway stations by line order in Sri Lanka
Sri Lanka Railways

Railway stations on the Kelani Valley railway line
Railway stations in Colombo District